(Scholl Siblings Plaza) is a short semi-circular plaza located in front of the main building of the Ludwig Maximilian University of Munich, located on the Ludwigstraße in Munich, Germany. The plaza is named in memory of Sophie Scholl and her brother, Hans Scholl, students at Ludwig Maximilian University of Munich during World War II who were among the founding members of the White Rose resistance movement.

Images

References

Squares in Munich